Ólafur Ingi Stígsson (born 16 December 1975) is a retired Icelandic footballer. He spent the majority of his playing career with Fylkir, making more than 150 league appearances for the club. Ólafur has also assisted Valur and had spells in Scotland and Norway with East Fife and Molde FK respectively.

Ólafur represented Iceland at youth level in three different age groups: under-17, under-19 and under-21. He made his senior international debut on 15 August 2001, coming on as a substitute for Auðun Helgason in the 1–1 draw with Poland. Ólafur went on to win nine caps for his country, and made his final appearance for Iceland in the goalless draw with Mexico on 20 November 2003.

References

1975 births
Living people
Olafur Stigsson
Olafur Stigsson
Olafur Stigsson
Olafur Stigsson
Olafur Stigsson
Association football midfielders
Olafur Stigsson
Eliteserien players
Olafur Stigsson
East Fife F.C. players
Olafur Stigsson
Molde FK players
Expatriate footballers in Scotland
Expatriate footballers in Norway